Weslie "Wes" Ting Gatchalian (born August 11, 1980) is a Filipino politician who has served as the 27th mayor of Valenzuela since 2022. A member of the Nationalist People's Coalition, Gatchalian was first elected to public office in 2013, as the party-list representative of Alay Buhay Partylist, serving until 2016, where he was elected as the district representative for Valenzuela's 1st district. As a representative, Gatchalian served as House Deputy Speaker from 2020 to 2022.

Gatchalian is a member of a political dynasty in the Philippines, being the brother of Senator Win Gatchalian and Representative Rex Gatchalian, the latter of whom was succeeded by Wes as mayor of Valenzuela in 2022.

Personal life 
Gatchalian was born on August 11, 1980 to industrialist William Gatchalian and Dee Hua Ting. He is the youngest of four siblings, namely Sherwin, Kenneth, and Rexlon. The Gatchalian family identifies as Christian with Dee Hua being a pastor and chairman at their own church called Jesus our Life Ministries in Barangay Maysan, Valenzuela.

He was assistant to the president of Waterfront Hotels and Casinos, the country's largest Filipino-owned first class hotel operator. He was also elected as president and CEO of Wellex Industries Inc.

Educational Background 
Gatchalian received a secondary diploma at Xavier High School (1999), took business administration at Bryant University (2000), BA Honours Degree/DipHE Business and operations management second class and second division degree at Oxford Brookes University (2003), master's degree at London Metropolitan University, and took an executive course on legislation at UP-NCPAG.

Political career

2007 Congressional bid 
Gatchalian ran for representative of Valenzuela's 2nd district in 2007, losing to former Representative Magi Gunigundo.

Representative for the 16th to 18th Congress

16th Congress 
He was elected representative for the Alay Buhay Partylist in 2013.

Committee Membership:
 Chairman
 Committee on Youth and Sports Development
 Vice Chairman
 Committee on Overseas Workers Affairs
 Committee on Small Business and Entrepreneurship Development
 Committee on the XXXI Summer Olympic Games
 Membership
 Committee on Cooperatives Development
 Committee on Economic Affairs
 Committee on Population and Family Relations

17th Congress 
In 2016 elections, Gatchalian was elected to his first term as Valenzuela's 1st district representative, succeeding his brother Win.

18th Congress 
On 18th Congress of the Philippines, Gatchalian was re-elected as representative of Valenzuela's first district for his second term as congressman. He is one of house deputy speakers of the Philippine House of Representatives since December 7, 2020.

He authored House Bill 02313. The purpose of House Bill 02313 is to mandate ownership registration for all pre-paid SIM cards to stop criminal activities through internet and specially to stop internet trolls. This was vetoed by the president.

On July 10, 2020, Gatchalian voted to reject the franchise renewal of ABS-CBN together with Valenzuela's 2nd district representative Eric Martinez and 68 other representatives.

One of his projects, the Wellness Entertain Sports (WES) Arena in Barangay Punturin, Valenzuela, was launched on October 7, 2021. WES Arena is also one of venues of Bongbong Marcos 2022 presidential campaign.

Laws Passed

16th Congress 
The following are the bills enacted into law made by Weslie Gatchalian on 16th congress.

National:

 RA#10643
 RA#10665
 RA#10667
 RA#11679
 RA#11699
 RA#11744

17th Congress 
The following are the bills enacted into law made by Weslie Gatchalian on 17th congress.

National:

 RA#10925
 RA#10931
 RA#10963
 RA#11037
 RA#11055
 RA#11202
 RA#11215
 RA#11219
 RA#11213
 RA#11302
 RA#11319
 RA#11320
 RA#11342
 RA#11353
 RA#11354
 RA#11355
 RA#11357
 RA#11414
 RA#11350

Local:

 RA#10958
 RA#10991
 RA#11017
 RA#11074
 RA#11092
 RA#11094
 RA#11218

18th Congress 
The following are the bills enacted into law made by Hon. Weslie Gatchalian on 18th congress.

National:

 RA#11462
 RA#11463
 RA#11466
 RA#11467
 RA#11480
 RA#11494
 RA#11525
 RA#11506
 RA#11517
 RA#11519
 RA#11520
 RA#11524
 RA#11534
 RA#11537
 RA#11552
 RA#11548
 RA#11569
 RA#11572
 RA#11592
 RA#11595
 RA#11635

local:

 RA#11472
 RA#11473
 RA#11478
 RA#11495
 RA#11500
 RA#11546
 RA#11556
 RA#11560
 RA#11566
 RA#11631
 RA#11632

Mayor of Valenzuela (2022–present) 
Gatchalian was elected as the mayor of Valenzuela in the 2022 local elections, succeeding his brother Rex who had served since 2013. He was elected with 275,650 votes or 78.61% of the votes, defeating his sole opponent Bombit Bernardo who received 75,026 votes or 21.39% of the votes. In his campaign, he did not deny being part of a political dynasty, stating that there are good and bad political dynasties.

He took the oath of office on June 29, 2022 at WES Arena in Barangay Punturin, alongside his brother, Win, who was re-elected as senator. Among the attendees in his oath-taking were Vice Mayor Lorena Natividad-Borja, Representatives Rex Gatchalian and Eric Martinez, and Senator Imee Marcos. He is the member of his family to be the city's mayor, following his brothers Win and Rex.

References 

|-

1980 births
Living people
Filipino Christians
Filipino evangelicals
Nationalist People's Coalition politicians
Members of the House of Representatives of the Philippines from Valenzuela, Metro Manila
Mayors of Valenzuela, Metro Manila
People from Valenzuela, Metro Manila